The  is a city tram station on the Takaoka Kidō Line located in Takaoka, Toyama Prefecture, Japan. The station is sometimes called  because it's closer to the city offices than Honmaru Kaikan-mae Station.

Surrounding area
Takaoka City Offices

Railway stations in Toyama Prefecture